Bognie Castle (also called Conzie Castle) is a ruined castle near Huntly and Banff in the Aberdeenshire region of Scotland. It was built in the 17th century and is now ruined. It once rose 4 stories high, but according to tradition was never inhabited. It shows traces of a plain building, and apparently existed in 1696.

There seems to be some confusion in the name of this house, but local enquiries failed to confirm if it had ever been known by any name other than 'Conzie', the only information being that it was originally situated on land belonging to the farm of Conzie, but now belongs to Bognie.

History 
Dating from the second half of the 17th century, Bognie Castle was built by the Clan Morrison. It is designated, together with the remains of an associated dovecote, a Scheduled ancient monument.

This was the mansion of Pennyburn which was under construction when the last Viscount Frendraught died (i.e. in 1698), and was never completed. Castle Conzie stood a little to the west of Bognie House but no trace of it remains. The Dunbars of Conzie lived here for nearly two hundred years.

References

External links
 Geograph: Conzie Castle
 Canmore

Castles in Aberdeenshire
Scheduled Ancient Monuments in Aberdeenshire